Nelson Mandela High School is a high school in the city of Calgary. It accommodates approximately 1800 students in grades 10–12. The school is part of the Calgary Board of Education's public school system.

History 
The name of the school was chosen after gathering and evaluating input from parents, and community members, the school naming committee recommended this name to the board of trustees for its approval. The committee was composed of CBE Trustees, parent and/or community representatives, students and members of CBE administration. Nelson Mandela High School also houses one of the best robotics programs in the city, their team has gone to nationals 4 years in a row. This schools clubs are almost completely student run to help the students learn how to lead a team.

References

High schools in Calgary
Educational institutions established in 2016
2016 establishments in Alberta